Latin lambda is an additional letter of the Latin script, based on the letter lambda from the Greek alphabet. It is used in Heiltsuk, Liqʼwala, Kwakʼwala, and Pilagá. In these languages, Latin lambda represents a variety of lateral phonemes. The lower-case variant is displayed as a homoglyph of lower-case lambda. The upper-case variant differs from lambda in that it resembles a turned y.

Usage 
The letter appears in the Liqʼwala dialect of Kwakʼwala language, where it represents . In Kwakʼwala, Latin lambda may also be used instead of the digraph .

In the Pilagá language, Latin lambda is used to represent .

References 

L|Lambda, Latin